Oliver Baez Bendorf (born 1987) is an American poet.

Early life and education 
Oliver Baez Bendorf was born on June 21, 1987, in Iowa City, Iowa. His poems sometimes feature the landscape of his childhood, and his writing about returning to Iowa for a visit while transitioning genders was published in Buzzfeed. He graduated with a BA from the University of Iowa in 2009. In 2013, he earned an MFA in poetry from the University of Wisconsin-Madison, where he met his teachers Lynda Barry, Quan Barry, Amaud Jamaul Johnson, Jesse Lee Kercheval, and Ronald Wallace. In 2015, he received an MA in Library and Information Studies, also from the University of Wisconsin-Madison, where he worked with The Little Magazine Collection, one of the most extensive of its kind in the United States. Bendorf is a fellow of the CantoMundo Poetry Workshop.

Career 
Bendorf's poetry publications include the book The Spectral Wilderness, selected by Mark Doty for the 2013 Stan & Tom Wick Poetry Prize, and released by Kent State University Press in 2015, and Advantages of Being Evergreen, which was selected for the 2018 Open Book Poetry Competition from Cleveland State University Poetry Center and published in September 2019.  American poet Gabrielle Calvocoressi called Advantages of Being Evergreen "an essential book for our time and for all time" and wrote that "Baez Bendorf is making a future grammar for the moment all of our vessels are free and held. I am living for the world these poems anticipate… This is a book of the earth’s abiding wonder. And the body’s unbreakable ability to bloom."

His third book of poems, Consider the Rooster, will be published by Nightboat Books in 2024.

His work has appeared in publications including Academy of American Poets' Poem-a-Day, American Poetry Review, BOMB, Black Warrior Review, jubilat, Poetry Magazine, and Troubling the Line: Trans and Genderqueer Poetry and Poetics. He has published essays and comics poetry, in addition to poetry, and his poetry has been translated into Russian by Dmitry Kuzmin.

He has taught poetry and creative writing at University of Wisconsin-Madison, 826DC, Madison Public Library, District of Columbia Public Schools, Mount Holyoke College, Wick Poetry Center, Kalamazoo College, Bread Loaf Environmental Writers' Conference, and elsewhere.

Bendorf is a transgender man, and has used his work to discuss gender identity and transition, sometimes in humorous ways. He is of German, Southern Italian, and Puerto Rican (Afro-Taíno and Spanish) ancestry.

In 2020, Bendorf was awarded the Betty Berzon Emerging Writer Award from Publishing Triangle, presented to an LGBTQ writer who has shown exceptional talent and promise. Bendorf was a 2021 National Endowment for the Arts Fellow. In 2021, he joined the poetry faculty of the low-residency MFA Program for Writers at Warren Wilson College.

Awards and honors 
 2021 National Endowment for the Arts Fellowship for Poetry
2020 Betty Berzon Emerging Writer Award, Publishing Triangle
2019 Rane Arroyo Chapbook Series Prize, Seven Kitchens Press
2018 Open Book Poetry Competition, Cleveland State University Poetry Center
2017-2018 Halls Emerging Artist Fellowship at the Wisconsin Institute for Creative Writing
 2015 New American Poets, Poetry Society of America. Selected by Natalie Diaz
 2013-14 Doug Fir Fiction Award, The Bear Deluxe. Selected by Lidia Yuknavitch
 2013 Stan & Tom Wick Poetry Prize, The Spectral Wilderness, Kent State University Press, 2015. Selected by Mark Doty
 2011-13 Martha Meier Renk Distinguished Graduate Fellowship in Poetry at University of Wisconsin-Madison

Bibliography 
 Book: Advantages of Being Evergreen. Cleveland State University Poetry Center. 2019. .
Book:

References 

1987 births
Living people
Writers from Iowa City, Iowa
University of Iowa alumni
University of Wisconsin–Madison alumni
University of Wisconsin–Madison faculty
21st-century American poets
American LGBT poets
LGBT people from Iowa
National Endowment for the Arts Fellows
Poets from Iowa
Poets from Wisconsin
Transgender men
American people of Puerto Rican descent
Kalamazoo College faculty
LGBT Hispanic and Latino American people
Transgender academics
American transgender writers